Walnut Lake is a private, all-sports, 233-acre lake in West Bloomfield Township, Oakland County, in the U.S. state of Michigan.

The Walnut Lake shoreline is lined with high-end exclusive homes.

The  lake is the fifth-deepest lake in Oakland County.

References

Lakes of Oakland County, Michigan
Lakes of Michigan